Borgenhaugen is a borough in the city of Sarpsborg, Norway, located east of the city centre. Before 1992, Borgenhaugen was a part of Skjeberg municipality. The old Skjeberg council hall (rådhus) is located here.

Local placenames
 Surfellingen
 Kala
 Nygårdshaugen
 Hafslund
 Nordberg
 Bede
 Navestad
 Borgen

Attractions
 Isesjøen 
 Kalabanen

External links
Homepage for the area Borgenhaugen  (Norwegian)

Villages in Østfold
Sarpsborg
Boroughs of Norway